John Gunnar Rafael Storgårds (born October 20, 1963) is a Finnish violinist and conductor.

Biography 
John Storgårds war born in Helsinki, the son of economist Gunnar Storgårds and his wife Marjatta, née Ikonen. He studied violin with Esther Raitio and Jouko Ignatius at the Sibelius Academy in Helsinki, and continued his violin studies with Chaim Taub in Israel. He was a founding member of the Avanti! Chamber Orchestra. After experience leading orchestras from the front desk of the violin section, his interest in conducting increased after an invitation to conduct the Helsinki University Symphony Orchestra.  He subsequently returned to the Sibelius Academy from 1993–1997 to study conducting with Jorma Panula and Eri Klas.

In 1996, Storgårds became Artistic Director of the Chamber Orchestra of Lapland.  With the Helsinki Philharmonic Orchestra, he became Principal Guest Conductor in 2003 and subsequently Chief Conductor in autumn 2008, for an initial contract of 4 years.  Following an extension of his Helsinki contract to 2014, Storgårds concluded his Helsinki tenure in December 2015.  From 2006 to 2009, Storgårds was Chief Conductor of the Tampere Philharmonic Orchestra.  Storgårds has held the Artistic Directorships of many summer festivals, most recently of the Korsholm Music Festival between 2004–2006, and Avanti!'s Summer Sounds Festival. In 2017, he conducted the premiere of Sebastian Fagerlund's Autumn Sonata.

Outside of Finland, Storgårds first guest-conducted the BBC Philharmonic in 2010.  In March 2011, the orchestra named him its principal guest conductor, effective January 2012.  In January 2015, Storgårds was named the new principal guest conductor of the National Arts Centre Orchestra (NACO), only the second conductor ever to hold the title, effective with the 2015–2016 season with an initial contract of 3 seasons.  In 2017, the BBC Philharmonic changed Storgårds' title with the orchestra to chief guest conductor.  In November 2022, the BBC Philharmonic named Storgårds its chief conductor, with immediate effect.

Storgårds received the Finnish State Prize for Music in 2002.  He has made a number of international recordings for Ondine, Sony, BIS,  Da Capo Records, and Chandos Records including recordings of music by Andrzej Panufnik, John Corigliano, Per Nørgård, and George Antheil. His recording of Pēteris Vasks' Violin Concerto Distant Light and Second Symphony won the Cannes Classical Disc of the Year Award in 2004.  In 2014, his recording with the BBC Philharmonic of the complete symphonies of Jean Sibelius was released, including his second recording of three fragments of the Eighth Symphony.

Storgårds and his family live in Rovaniemi.  He and his wife have their two sons.

References

External links
 Official website of John Storgårds
 Konzertdirektion Schmid agency biography of Storgårds

1963 births
Living people
Finnish conductors (music)
Swedish-speaking Finns
Musicians from Helsinki
21st-century conductors (music)